Lionel George Bridges Justice Ford (3 September 1865 – 27  March 1932) was an Anglican priest who served as Dean of York after two headmasterships at notable English independent schools.

Biography
Ford was born in Paddington, London, the son of William Augustus Ford and Katherine Mary Justice. His father had played cricket for the Marylebone Cricket Club ("MCC") and his brother Francis Ford played cricket for England. Ford's grandfather was George Samuel Ford, a well known bill discounter.

Ford was educated at Repton School and King's College, Cambridge, where he won the Chancellor's Classical Medal and was a member of the Pitt Club.  He became a school master at Eton, and was ordained a curate in the Anglican church in 1893. In 1898 and 1899 he played cricket for minor county Buckinghamshire.

Career
Ford became headmaster of Repton School in 1901 and in 1910 moved to Harrow, where he was headmaster until 1925.  in 1925 he became the dean at York, a post he was to hold until his death on Easter Sunday seven years later. His memorial is in the restored Zouche Chapel.

Personal life
Ford married in 1904 Mary Catherine Talbot, daughter of the education campaigner Lavinia Talbot and Edward Stuart Talbot, who was successively Bishop of Rochester, Southwark and Winchester. They had:
Neville Ford (1906–2000), a notable cricketer for Derbyshire, who married Patricia Smiles, daughter of Ulster Unionist MP W. D. Smiles and Margaret Heighway, and great-niece of Mrs Beeton, in 1941
Edward Ford (1910–2006), a courtier in the Royal Household of King George VI and Queen Elizabeth II, who married the widow Virginia Brand Polk, daughter of Robert Brand, 1st Baron Brand, in 1949.

References

External links
Portrait of Lionel Ford

1865 births
1932 deaths
People educated at Repton School
Alumni of King's College, Cambridge
Deans of York
20th-century English Anglican priests
English cricketers
Buckinghamshire cricketers
Head Masters of Harrow School
Headmasters of Repton School
Sportspeople from Yorkshire
People from Paddington
Teachers at Eton College